lowFLOWs: The Columbia Anthology ('91–'93) is a compilation album by the American alternative rock group Firehose released in 2012 to coincide with the band's reunion gigs of the same year. 

The anthology collects all the band's releases on Columbia Records: Flyin' the Flannel, Mr. Machinery Operator, and Live Totem Pole. Also included and a handful of previously unreleased live tracks and instrumental versions. The anthology is the first time material from the long out-of-print Live Totem Pole has been made available.

Bassist Mike Watt said it was the work of the record label and not the band itself.

Track listing 
Disk One

Down with the Bass
Up Finnegan's Ladder
Can't Believe
Walking the Cow (Daniel Johnston cover)
Flyin' the Flannel
Epoxy, For Example
O'er the Town of Pedro
Too Long
The First Cuss
Anti-Misogyny Maneuver
Toolin'
Song for Dave Alvin
Tien an Man Dream Again
Lost Colors
Towin' the Line
Losers, Boozers and Heroes
Max and Wells (re-done by Mike Watt with Mark Lanegan on Ball-Hog or Tugboat?)
Down with the Bass (Instrumental)
The Red and the Black (Blue Öyster Cult cover - Live)
Sophisticated Bitch (Public Enemy) cover - Live)
Revolution, Pt. 2 (Butthole Surfers cover - Live)
Slack Motherfucker (Superchunk cover - Live)
What Gets Heard (cover - Live)
Mannequin (Wire cover - Live)
Makin' the Freeway (Live)

Disk Two

Formal Introduction
Blaze
Herded Into Pools
Witness
Number Seven
Powerful Hankerin'
Rocket Sled / Fuel Tank
Quicksand
Disciples Of The 3-Way
More Famous Quotes
Sincerely
Hell-Hole
4.29.92
The Cliffs Thrown Down
Blaze (Instrumental)
Witness (Mersh Again Edit)
4.29.92 (Live)
Powerful Hankerin' (Live)
Tien An Man Dream Again (Live)
Formal Introduction (Live)

Reception
PopMatters gave it seven out of ten stars and called it "a great rock 'n roll story." Spectrum Culture gave it three and a half out of five stars saying "Though lowFLOWs doesn’t quite live up to the expectation of rewriting the history of a beloved if somewhat obscured underground band that went big, it does at least do justice to its source material, giving it a nice but unobtrusive touch-up." Pitchfork gave it 7.9 out of 10 and called it "a pleasure to revisit a group that served so necessary a function for all involved, driven on by heart, their blue-collar work ethic, and stubborn perseverance."

References

Firehose (band) albums
2012 live albums
Columbia Records albums